Cover Your Tracks is the second full-length album from the metalcore band Bury Your Dead. It was released October 19, 2004, on Victory Records and features re-recordings of two songs from Bury Your Dead's first full-length You Had Me at Hello. All songs are named after Tom Cruise movies.

Track listing

Music videos were released for "Magnolia" and "The Color of Money".

Credits

Band
Mat Bruso - vocals
Brendan "Slim" MacDonald - guitars
Eric Ellis - guitars
Rich Casey - bass
Mark Castillo - drums

Other
Matthew Ellard - production, mixing
Alan Douches - mastering
Adam Wentworth - layout, design
Robert Lotzko - photography
Chris Daniele - model
Krista Kovacs - model
Elisha Kovacs - model
Mark and Liz Copec - cars
John Domminello - tuxedos

References

Bury Your Dead albums
2004 albums
Victory Records albums